John W. Williams (February 25, 1928 – June 6, 2015) was an American art historian was an expert in Spanish medieval art. He was Andrew W. Mellon Professor of History of Art and Architecture end eventually Professor Emeritus, Medieval Art and Architecture, both at the University of Pittsburgh.

Williams's best known work is The Illustrated Beatus, a five-volume work. It was turned into the documentary film Beatus: The Spanish Apocalypse.

References

1928 births
2015 deaths
American art historians
Deaths from cancer in the United States
University of Michigan alumni
University of Pittsburgh faculty